Malmin Palloseura (abbreviated as MPS) is a Helsinki-based football club that was formed in 1948. The club's first team has been playing mostly in the Second and Third Divisions. Currently the team plays in the Kakkonen which is the third tier of the Finnish football system. MPS plays its home games at Siltamäki, Tapuli, Tapanila and Pukinmäki sports parks.

Background
MPS (often known as "mapsi" or "ämpsi") is widely appreciated for their good work in developing junior football. Currently, the best known youngsters that have come through the club's ranks are Vesa Vasara (FC Honka), John Kangas (FC Honka), Roope Heilala (FC Honka) and Mika Kottila (MPS).

MPS are one of Helsinki's biggest football clubs and the junior section has enjoyed great prestige. Each year new teams are formed and the membership is constantly growing. A key priority for MPS is the development of youth and junior football education .  Youngsters are then able to progress to the adult male and female teams.

An interesting development has been the progress of Atletico Malmi who since 2007 have achieved 3 consecutive promotions moving from the Kutonen (Sixth Division) to the Kolmonen (Third Division) to now play at the same level as the club's first team.

MPS is affiliated to the Helsinki District Association of the Football Association of Finland. In 2003 it was the District Association's Club of the Year and in 1998 won the Fair Play Award.

Season to season

First team

{|  class="wikitable"
|- style="background:#f0f6fa;"
!Season
!Level
!Division
!Section
!Administration
!Position
!Movements
|-
|style="background:#77DD77;"|1948
|style="background:#77DD77;"|Tier 3
|style="background:#77DD77;"|Suomensarjan karsinnat 
|style="background:#77DD77;"|Cup format
|style="background:#77DD77;"|Finnish FA & TUL(Suomen Pallolitto & Työväen Urheiluliitto)
|style="background:#77DD77;"|2nd round
|style="background:#77DD77;"|Qualifier for Suomensarja, qualified from TUL leagues
|-
|style="background:#77DD77;"|1949
|style="background:#77DD77;"|Tier 3
|style="background:#77DD77;"|Suomensarjan karsinnat 
|style="background:#77DD77;"|Cup format
|style="background:#77DD77;"|Finnish FA & TUL(Suomen Pallolitto & Työväen Urheiluliitto)
|style="background:#77DD77;"|2nd round
|style="background:#77DD77;"|Qualifier for Suomensarja, qualified from TUL leagues
|-
|style="background:#77DD77;"|1950
|style="background:#77DD77;"|Tier 3
|style="background:#77DD77;"|Suomensarjan karsinnat 
|style="background:#77DD77;"|East Group
|style="background:#77DD77;"|Finnish FA & TUL(Suomen Pallolitto & Työväen Urheiluliitto)
|style="background:#77DD77;"|8th
|style="background:#77DD77;"|Qualification for Suomensarja, qualified from TUL leagues
|-
|style="background:#77DD77;"|1951
|style="background:#77DD77;"|Tier 3
|style="background:#77DD77;"|Suomensarjan karsinnat 
|style="background:#77DD77;"|West Group
|style="background:#77DD77;"|Finnish FA & TUL(Suomen Pallolitto & Työväen Urheiluliitto)
|style="background:#77DD77;"|7th
|style="background:#77DD77;"|Qualification for Suomensarja, qualified from TUL leagues 
|-
|style="background:#77DD77;"|1952
|style="background:#77DD77;"|Tier 3
|style="background:#77DD77;"|Suomensarjan karsinnat 
|style="background:#77DD77;"|East Group
|style="background:#77DD77;"|Finnish FA & TUL(Suomen Pallolitto & Työväen Urheiluliitto)
|style="background:#77DD77;"|6th
|style="background:#77DD77;"|Qualification for Suomensarja, qualified from TUL leagues
|-
|style="background:#FF7F00;"|1953
|style="background:#FF7F00;"|Tier 4
|style="background:#FF7F00;"|Piirinsarja (District Leagues)
|style="background:#FF7F00;"|
|style="background:#FF7F00;"|Helsinki & Uusimaa (SPL Helsinki)
|style="background:#FF7F00;"|
|style="background:#FF7F00;"|
|-
|style="background:#77DD77;"|1954
|style="background:#77DD77;"|Tier 3
|style="background:#77DD77;"|Maakuntasarja (Third Division)
|style="background:#77DD77;"|West Group IV
|style="background:#77DD77;"|Finnish FA (Suomen Pallolitto)
|style="background:#77DD77;"|11th
|style="background:#77DD77;"|Relegated
|-
|style="background:#FF7F00;"|1955
|style="background:#FF7F00;"|Tier 4
|style="background:#FF7F00;"|Piirinsarja (District Leagues)
|style="background:#FF7F00;"|
|style="background:#FF7F00;"|Helsinki & Uusimaa (SPL Helsinki)
|style="background:#FF7F00;"|
|style="background:#FF7F00;"|Promotion Playoff
|-
|style="background:#FF7F00;"|1956
|style="background:#FF7F00;"|Tier 4
|style="background:#FF7F00;"|Aluesarja (Fourth Division)
|style="background:#FF7F00;"|Group 1 Helsinki & Central Uusimaa
|style="background:#FF7F00;"|Finnish FA (Suomen Pallolitto)
|style="background:#FF7F00;"|4th
|style="background:#FF7F00;"|
|-
|style="background:#FF7F00;"|1957
|style="background:#FF7F00;"|Tier 4
|style="background:#FF7F00;"|Aluesarja (Fourth Division)
|style="background:#FF7F00;"|Group 3 Helsinki & Central Uusimaa
|style="background:#FF7F00;"|Finnish FA (Suomen Pallolitto)
|style="background:#FF7F00;"|3rd
|style="background:#FF7F00;"|
|-
|style="background:#FF7F00;"|1958
|style="background:#FF7F00;"|Tier 4
|style="background:#FF7F00;"|Aluesarja (Fourth Division)
|style="background:#FF7F00;"|Group 2 Helsinki
|style="background:#FF7F00;"|Finnish FA (Suomen Pallolitto)
|style="background:#FF7F00;"|3rd
|style="background:#FF7F00;"|
|-
|style="background:#FF7F00;"|1959
|style="background:#FF7F00;"|Tier 4
|style="background:#FF7F00;"|Aluesarja (Fourth Division)
|style="background:#FF7F00;"|Group 2 Helsinki
|style="background:#FF7F00;"|Finnish FA (Suomen Pallolitto)
|style="background:#FF7F00;"|1st
|style="background:#FF7F00;"|Promoted
|-
|style="background:#77DD77;"|1960
|style="background:#77DD77;"|Tier 3
|style="background:#77DD77;"|Maakuntasarja (Third Division)
|style="background:#77DD77;"|Group 1 Helsinki & Uusimaa
|style="background:#77DD77;"|Finnish FA (Suomen Pallolitto)
|style="background:#77DD77;"|3rd
|style="background:#77DD77;"|
|-
|style="background:#77DD77;"|1961
|style="background:#77DD77;"|Tier 3
|style="background:#77DD77;"|Maakuntasarja (Third Division)
|style="background:#77DD77;"|Group 1 Helsinki & Uusimaa
|style="background:#77DD77;"|Finnish FA (Suomen Pallolitto)
|style="background:#77DD77;"|1st
|style="background:#77DD77;"|Promoted
|-
|style="background:#87CEFA;"|1962
|style="background:#87CEFA;"|Tier 2
|style="background:#87CEFA;"|Suomensarja (First Division)
|style="background:#87CEFA;"|East Group
|style="background:#87CEFA;"|Finnish FA (Suomen Palloliitto)
|style="background:#87CEFA;"|9th
|style="background:#87CEFA;"|
|-
|style="background:#87CEFA;"|1963
|style="background:#87CEFA;"|Tier 2
|style="background:#87CEFA;"|Suomensarja (First Division)
|style="background:#87CEFA;"|East Group
|style="background:#87CEFA;"|Finnish FA (Suomen Palloliitto)
|style="background:#87CEFA;"|12th
|style="background:#87CEFA;"|Relegated
|-
|style="background:#77DD77;"|1964
|style="background:#77DD77;"|Tier 3
|style="background:#77DD77;"|Maakuntasarja (Third Division)
|style="background:#77DD77;"|Group 1 Helsinki & Uusimaa
|style="background:#77DD77;"|Finnish FA (Suomen Pallolitto)
|style="background:#77DD77;"|2nd
|style="background:#77DD77;"|
|-
|style="background:#77DD77;"|1965
|style="background:#77DD77;"|Tier 3
|style="background:#77DD77;"|Maakuntasarja (Third Division)
|style="background:#77DD77;"|Group 1 Helsinki & Uusimaa
|style="background:#77DD77;"|Finnish FA (Suomen Pallolitto)
|style="background:#77DD77;"|5th
|style="background:#77DD77;"|
|-
|style="background:#77DD77;"|1966
|style="background:#77DD77;"|Tier 3
|style="background:#77DD77;"|Maakuntasarja (Third Division)
|style="background:#77DD77;"|Group 1 Helsinki
|style="background:#77DD77;"|Finnish FA (Suomen Pallolitto)
|style="background:#77DD77;"|5th
|style="background:#77DD77;"|
|-
|style="background:#77DD77;"|1967
|style="background:#77DD77;"|Tier 3
|style="background:#77DD77;"|Maakuntasarja (Third Division)
|style="background:#77DD77;"|Group 1 Helsinki & Uusimaa
|style="background:#77DD77;"|Finnish FA (Suomen Pallolitto)
|style="background:#77DD77;"|9th
|style="background:#77DD77;"|Relegated
|-
|style="background:#FF7F00;"|1968
|style="background:#FF7F00;"|Tier 4
|style="background:#FF7F00;"|Aluesarja (Fourth Division)
|style="background:#FF7F00;"|Group 2
|style="background:#FF7F00;"|Helsinki & Central Uusimaa (SPL Helsinki)
|style="background:#FF7F00;"|1st
|style="background:#FF7F00;"|Promotion Playoff
|-
|style="background:#FF7F00;"|1969
|style="background:#FF7F00;"|Tier 4
|style="background:#FF7F00;"|Aluesarja (Fourth Division)
|style="background:#FF7F00;"|Group 2
|style="background:#FF7F00;"|Helsinki & Uusimaa (SPL Helsinki)
|style="background:#FF7F00;"|4th
|style="background:#FF7F00;"|
|-
|style="background:#FF7F00;"|1970
|style="background:#FF7F00;"|Tier 4
|style="background:#FF7F00;"|IV Divisioona (Fourth Division)
|style="background:#FF7F00;"|Group 2
|style="background:#FF7F00;"|Helsinki & Uusimaa (SPL Helsinki)
|style="background:#FF7F00;"|2nd
|style="background:#FF7F00;"|
|-
|style="background:#FF7F00;"|1971
|style="background:#FF7F00;"|Tier 4
|style="background:#FF7F00;"|IV Divisioona (Fourth Division)
|style="background:#FF7F00;"|Group 1
|style="background:#FF7F00;"|Helsinki & Uusimaa (SPL Helsinki)
|style="background:#FF7F00;"|6th
|style="background:#FF7F00;"|
|-
|style="background:#FF7F00;"|1972
|style="background:#FF7F00;"|Tier 4
|style="background:#FF7F00;"|IV Divisioona (Fourth Division)
|style="background:#FF7F00;"|Group 2
|style="background:#FF7F00;"|Helsinki & Uusimaa (SPL Helsinki)
|style="background:#FF7F00;"|7th
|style="background:#FF7F00;"|
|-
|style="background:#CECE1B;"|1973
|style="background:#CECE1B;"|Tier 5
|style="background:#CECE1B;"|IV Divisioona (Fourth Division)
|style="background:#CECE1B;"|Group 1
|style="background:#CECE1B;"|Helsinki & Uusimaa(SPL Helsinki)
|style="background:#CECE1B;"|8th
|style="background:#CECE1B;"|Relegation Playoff
|-
|style="background:#CECE1B;"|1974
|style="background:#CECE1B;"|Tier 5
|style="background:#CECE1B;"|IV Divisioona (Fourth Division)
|style="background:#CECE1B;"|Group 2
|style="background:#CECE1B;"|Helsinki & Uusimaa(SPL Helsinki)
|style="background:#CECE1B;"|4th
|style="background:#CECE1B;"|
|-
|style="background:#CECE1B;"|1975
|style="background:#CECE1B;"|Tier 5
|style="background:#CECE1B;"|IV Divisioona (Fourth Division)
|style="background:#CECE1B;"|Group 1
|style="background:#CECE1B;"|Helsinki & Uusimaa(SPL Helsinki)
|style="background:#CECE1B;"|3rd
|style="background:#CECE1B;"|
|-
|style="background:#CECE1B;"|1976
|style="background:#CECE1B;"|Tier 5
|style="background:#CECE1B;"|IV Divisioona (Fourth Division)
|style="background:#CECE1B;"|Group 1
|style="background:#CECE1B;"|Helsinki & Uusimaa(SPL Helsinki)
|style="background:#CECE1B;"|2nd
|style="background:#CECE1B;"|
|-
|style="background:#CECE1B;"|1977
|style="background:#CECE1B;"|Tier 5
|style="background:#CECE1B;"|IV Divisioona (Fourth Division)
|style="background:#CECE1B;"|Group 2
|style="background:#CECE1B;"|Helsinki & Uusimaa(SPL Helsinki)
|style="background:#CECE1B;"|4th
|style="background:#CECE1B;"|
|-
|style="background:#CECE1B;"|1978
|style="background:#CECE1B;"|Tier 5
|style="background:#CECE1B;"|IV Divisioona (Fourth Division)
|style="background:#CECE1B;"|Group 2
|style="background:#CECE1B;"|Helsinki & Uusimaa(SPL Helsinki)
|style="background:#CECE1B;"|2nd
|style="background:#CECE1B;"|Promotion Playoff
|-
|style="background:#CECE1B;"|1979
|style="background:#CECE1B;"|Tier 5
|style="background:#CECE1B;"|IV Divisioona (Fourth Division)
|style="background:#CECE1B;"|Group 3
|style="background:#CECE1B;"|Helsinki & Uusimaa(SPL Helsinki)
|style="background:#CECE1B;"|1st
|style="background:#CECE1B;"|Promotion Playoff - Promoted
|-
|style="background:#FF7F00;"|1980
|style="background:#FF7F00;"|Tier 4
|style="background:#FF7F00;"|III Divisioona (Third Division)
|style="background:#FF7F00;"|Group 1
|style="background:#FF7F00;"|Helsinki & Uusimaa (SPL Helsinki)
|style="background:#FF7F00;"|8th
|style="background:#FF7F00;"|
|-
|style="background:#FF7F00;"|1981
|style="background:#FF7F00;"|Tier 4
|style="background:#FF7F00;"|III Divisioona (Third Division)
|style="background:#FF7F00;"|Group 1
|style="background:#FF7F00;"|Helsinki & Uusimaa (SPL Helsinki)
|style="background:#FF7F00;"|9th
|style="background:#FF7F00;"|
|-
|style="background:#FF7F00;"|1982
|style="background:#FF7F00;"|Tier 4
|style="background:#FF7F00;"|III Divisioona (Third Division)
|style="background:#FF7F00;"|Group 2
|style="background:#FF7F00;"|Helsinki & Uusimaa (SPL Helsinki)
|style="background:#FF7F00;"|11th
|style="background:#FF7F00;"|Relegated
|-
|style="background:#CECE1B;"|1983
|style="background:#CECE1B;"|Tier 5
|style="background:#CECE1B;"|IV Divisioona (Fourth Division)
|style="background:#CECE1B;"|Group 2
|style="background:#CECE1B;"|Helsinki & Uusimaa(SPL Helsinki)
|style="background:#CECE1B;"|1st
|style="background:#CECE1B;"|Promotion Playoff - Promoted
|-
|style="background:#FF7F00;"|1984
|style="background:#FF7F00;"|Tier 4
|style="background:#FF7F00;"|III Divisioona (Third Division)
|style="background:#FF7F00;"|Group 2
|style="background:#FF7F00;"|Helsinki & Uusimaa (SPL Helsinki)
|style="background:#FF7F00;"|6th
|style="background:#FF7F00;"|
|-
|style="background:#FF7F00;"|1985
|style="background:#FF7F00;"|Tier 4
|style="background:#FF7F00;"|III Divisioona (Third Division)
|style="background:#FF7F00;"|Group 1
|style="background:#FF7F00;"|Helsinki & Uusimaa (SPL Helsinki)
|style="background:#FF7F00;"|8th
|style="background:#FF7F00;"|
|-
|style="background:#FF7F00;"|1986
|style="background:#FF7F00;"|Tier 4
|style="background:#FF7F00;"|III Divisioona (Third Division)
|style="background:#FF7F00;"|Group 1
|style="background:#FF7F00;"|Helsinki & Uusimaa (SPL Helsinki)
|style="background:#FF7F00;"|2nd
|style="background:#FF7F00;"|
|-
|style="background:#FF7F00;"|1987
|style="background:#FF7F00;"|Tier 4
|style="background:#FF7F00;"|III Divisioona (Third Division)
|style="background:#FF7F00;"|Group 1
|style="background:#FF7F00;"|Helsinki & Uusimaa (SPL Helsinki)
|style="background:#FF7F00;"|7th
|style="background:#FF7F00;"|
|-
|style="background:#FF7F00;"|1988
|style="background:#FF7F00;"|Tier 4
|style="background:#FF7F00;"|III Divisioona (Third Division)
|style="background:#FF7F00;"|Group 1
|style="background:#FF7F00;"|Helsinki & Uusimaa (SPL Helsinki)
|style="background:#FF7F00;"|4th
|style="background:#FF7F00;"|
|-
|style="background:#FF7F00;"|1989
|style="background:#FF7F00;"|Tier 4
|style="background:#FF7F00;"|III Divisioona (Third Division)
|style="background:#FF7F00;"|Group 2
|style="background:#FF7F00;"|Helsinki & Uusimaa (SPL Helsinki)
|style="background:#FF7F00;"|8th
|style="background:#FF7F00;"|
|-
|style="background:#FF7F00;"|1990
|style="background:#FF7F00;"|Tier 4
|style="background:#FF7F00;"|III Divisioona (Third Division)
|style="background:#FF7F00;"|Group 1
|style="background:#FF7F00;"|Helsinki & Uusimaa (SPL Helsinki)
|style="background:#FF7F00;"|7th
|style="background:#FF7F00;"|
|-
|style="background:#FF7F00;"|1991
|style="background:#FF7F00;"|Tier 4
|style="background:#FF7F00;"|III Divisioona (Third Division)
|style="background:#FF7F00;"|Group 1
|style="background:#FF7F00;"|Helsinki & Uusimaa (SPL Helsinki)
|style="background:#FF7F00;"|2nd
|style="background:#FF7F00;"|
|-
|style="background:#FF7F00;"|1992
|style="background:#FF7F00;"|Tier 4
|style="background:#FF7F00;"|III Divisioona (Third Division)
|style="background:#FF7F00;"|Group 1
|style="background:#FF7F00;"|Helsinki & Uusimaa (SPL Helsinki)
|style="background:#FF7F00;"|2nd
|style="background:#FF7F00;"|Promoted
|-
|style="background:#77DD77;"|1993
|style="background:#77DD77;"|Tier 3
|style="background:#77DD77;"|Kakkonen (Second Division)
|style="background:#77DD77;"|East Group
|style="background:#77DD77;"|Finnish FA (Suomen Pallolitto)
|style="background:#77DD77;"|10th
|style="background:#77DD77;"|
|-
|style="background:#77DD77;"|1994
|style="background:#77DD77;"|Tier 3
|style="background:#77DD77;"|Kakkonen (Second Division)
|style="background:#77DD77;"|South Group
|style="background:#77DD77;"|Finnish FA (Suomen Pallolitto)
|style="background:#77DD77;"|8th
|style="background:#77DD77;"|
|-
|style="background:#77DD77;"|1995
|style="background:#77DD77;"|Tier 3
|style="background:#77DD77;"|Kakkonen (Second Division)
|style="background:#77DD77;"|East Group
|style="background:#77DD77;"|Finnish FA (Suomen Pallolitto)
|style="background:#77DD77;"|8th
|style="background:#77DD77;"|
|-
|style="background:#77DD77;"|1996
|style="background:#77DD77;"|Tier 3
|style="background:#77DD77;"|Kakkonen (Second Division)
|style="background:#77DD77;"|South Group
|style="background:#77DD77;"|Finnish FA (Suomen Pallolitto)
|style="background:#77DD77;"|10th
|style="background:#77DD77;"|Relegated
|-
|style="background:#FF7F00;"|1997
|style="background:#FF7F00;"|Tier 4
|style="background:#FF7F00;"|Kolmonen (Third Division)
|style="background:#FF7F00;"|Group 2
|style="background:#FF7F00;"|Helsinki & Uusimaa (SPL Helsinki)
|style="background:#FF7F00;"|1st
|style="background:#FF7F00;"|Promoted
|-
|style="background:#77DD77;"|1998
|style="background:#77DD77;"|Tier 3
|style="background:#77DD77;"|Kakkonen (Second Division)
|style="background:#77DD77;"|South Group
|style="background:#77DD77;"|Finnish FA (Suomen Pallolitto)
|style="background:#77DD77;"|6th
|style="background:#77DD77;"|
|-
|style="background:#77DD77;"|1999
|style="background:#77DD77;"|Tier 3
|style="background:#77DD77;"|Kakkonen (Second Division)
|style="background:#77DD77;"|South Group
|style="background:#77DD77;"|Finnish FA (Suomen Pallolitto)
|style="background:#77DD77;"|11th
|style="background:#77DD77;"|Relegated
|-
|style="background:#FF7F00;"|2000
|style="background:#FF7F00;"|Tier 4
|style="background:#FF7F00;"|Kolmonen (Third Division)
|style="background:#FF7F00;"|Section 1
|style="background:#FF7F00;"|Helsinki & Uusimaa (SPL Helsinki)
|style="background:#FF7F00;"|1st
|style="background:#FF7F00;"|Promoted
|-
|style="background:#77DD77;"|2001
|style="background:#77DD77;"|Tier 3
|style="background:#77DD77;"|Kakkonen (Second Division)
|style="background:#77DD77;"|South Group
|style="background:#77DD77;"|Finnish FA (Suomen Pallolitto)
|style="background:#77DD77;"|11th
|style="background:#77DD77;"|Relegated
|-
|style="background:#FF7F00;"|2002
|style="background:#FF7F00;"|Tier 4
|style="background:#FF7F00;"|Kolmonen (Third Division)
|style="background:#FF7F00;"|Section 3
|style="background:#FF7F00;"|Helsinki & Uusimaa (SPL Helsinki)
|style="background:#FF7F00;"|8th
|style="background:#FF7F00;"|
|-
|style="background:#FF7F00;"|2003
|style="background:#FF7F00;"|Tier 4
|style="background:#FF7F00;"|Kolmonen (Third Division)
|style="background:#FF7F00;"|Section 3
|style="background:#FF7F00;"|Helsinki & Uusimaa (SPL Helsinki)
|style="background:#FF7F00;"|5th
|style="background:#FF7F00;"|
|-
|style="background:#FF7F00;"|2004
|style="background:#FF7F00;"|Tier 4
|style="background:#FF7F00;"|Kolmonen (Third Division)
|style="background:#FF7F00;"|Section 3
|style="background:#FF7F00;"|Helsinki & Uusimaa (SPL Helsinki)
|style="background:#FF7F00;"|3rd
|style="background:#FF7F00;"|
|-
|style="background:#FF7F00;"|2005
|style="background:#FF7F00;"|Tier 4
|style="background:#FF7F00;"|Kolmonen (Third Division)
|style="background:#FF7F00;"|Section 3
|style="background:#FF7F00;"|Helsinki & Uusimaa (SPL Helsinki)
|style="background:#FF7F00;"|1st
|style="background:#FF7F00;"|Play-off Group A – Promoted
|-
|style="background:#77DD77;"|2006
|style="background:#77DD77;"|Tier 3
|style="background:#77DD77;"|Kakkonen (Second Division)
|style="background:#77DD77;"|Group A
|style="background:#77DD77;"|Finnish FA (Suomen Pallolitto)
|style="background:#77DD77;"|10th
|style="background:#77DD77;"|
|-
|style="background:#77DD77;"|2007
|style="background:#77DD77;"|Tier 3
|style="background:#77DD77;"|Kakkonen (Second Division)
|style="background:#77DD77;"|Group A
|style="background:#77DD77;"|Finnish FA (Suomen Pallolitto)
|style="background:#77DD77;"|13th
|style="background:#77DD77;"|Relegated
|-
|style="background:#FF7F00;"|2008
|style="background:#FF7F00;"|Tier 4
|style="background:#FF7F00;"|Kolmonen (Third Division)
|style="background:#FF7F00;"|Section 2
|style="background:#FF7F00;"|Helsinki & Uusimaa (SPL Helsinki)
|style="background:#FF7F00;"|3rd
|style="background:#FF7F00;"|
|-
|style="background:#FF7F00;"|2009
|style="background:#FF7F00;"|Tier 4
|style="background:#FF7F00;"|Kolmonen (Third Division)
|style="background:#FF7F00;"|Section 2
|style="background:#FF7F00;"|Helsinki & Uusimaa (SPL Helsinki)
|style="background:#FF7F00;"|2nd
|style="background:#FF7F00;"|
|-
|style="background:#FF7F00;"|2010
|style="background:#FF7F00;"|Tier 4
|style="background:#FF7F00;"|Kolmonen (Third Division)
|style="background:#FF7F00;"|Section 2
|style="background:#FF7F00;"|Helsinki & Uusimaa (SPL Helsinki)
|style="background:#FF7F00;"|1st
|style="background:#FF7F00;"|Promoted
|-
|style="background:#77DD77;"|2011
|style="background:#77DD77;"|Tier 3
|style="background:#77DD77;"|Kakkonen (Second Division)
|style="background:#77DD77;"|Group A
|style="background:#77DD77;"|Finnish FA (Suomen Pallolitto)
|style="background:#77DD77;"|13th
|style="background:#77DD77;"|Relegated
|-
|style="background:#FF7F00;"|2012
|style="background:#FF7F00;"|Tier 4
|style="background:#FF7F00;"|Kolmonen (Third Division)
|style="background:#FF7F00;"|Section 1
|style="background:#FF7F00;"|Helsinki & Uusimaa (SPL Uusimaa)
|style="background:#FF7F00;"|3rd
|style="background:#FF7F00;"|
|-
|style="background:#FF7F00;"|2013
|style="background:#FF7F00;"|Tier 4
|style="background:#FF7F00;"|Kolmonen (Third Division)
|style="background:#FF7F00;"|Section 1
|style="background:#FF7F00;"|Helsinki & Uusimaa (SPL Helsinki)
|style="background:#FF7F00;"|'''5th
|style="background:#FF7F00;"|
|-
|style="background:#FF7F00;"|2014
|style="background:#FF7F00;"|Tier 4
|style="background:#FF7F00;"|Kolmonen (Third Division)
|style="background:#FF7F00;"|Section 2
|style="background:#FF7F00;"|Helsinki & Uusimaa (SPL Helsinki)
|style="background:#FF7F00;"|3rd|style="background:#FF7F00;"|
|-
|style="background:#FF7F00;"|2015
|style="background:#FF7F00;"|Tier 4
|style="background:#FF7F00;"|Kolmonen (Third Division)
|style="background:#FF7F00;"|Group 3
|style="background:#FF7F00;"|Helsinki & Uusimaa (SPL Helsinki)
|style="background:#FF7F00;"|1st|style="background:#FF7F00;"|Promoted
|-
|style="background:#77DD77;"|2016
|style="background:#77DD77;"|Tier 3
|style="background:#77DD77;"|Kakkonen (Second Division)
|style="background:#77DD77;"|Group A
|style="background:#77DD77;"|Finnish FA (Suomen Pallolitto)
|style="background:#77DD77;"|12th|style="background:#77DD77;"|Relegated
|-
|style="background:#FF7F00;"|2017
|style="background:#FF7F00;"|Tier 4
|style="background:#FF7F00;"|Kolmonen (Third Division)
|style="background:#FF7F00;"|Group 3
|style="background:#FF7F00;"|Helsinki & Uusimaa (SPL Helsinki)
|style="background:#FF7F00;"|11th|style="background:#FF7F00;"|Relegated - Team folded Atletico Malmi continues as a first team
|}2 seasons in Ykkönen18 seasons in Kakkonen37 seasons in Kolmonen8 seasons in Nelonen

Atletico Malmi

Club Structure
MPS currently has 6 men's team, 2 ladies teams, 3 veteran's teams, 13 boys teams and 7 girls team.

2010 season
For the current season MPS are running 6 Men's teams;MPS's First Team are competing in Section 2 (Lohko 2) of the Kolmonen administered by the Helsinki SPL.MPS /Atletico Malmi  are competing in Section 1 (Lohko 1) of the Kolmonen administered by the Uusimaa SPL. MPS/2 and MPS/Old Stars are participating in the Nelonen,  MPS 4 in the Kutonen and MPS / Atletico Akatemia''' in the Seiska – all administered by the Helsinki SPL.

References and sources
Official Malmin Palloseura Website
Atletico Malmi Website
Finnish Wikipedia
Suomen Cup
 Atletico Malmi Facebook

Footnotes

Football clubs in Helsinki
Association football clubs established in 1948
1948 establishments in Finland